Hezekiah University is an approved private university in Nigeria by federal government council. It is located in Umudi, Nkwerre Imo State Nigeria.

Hezekiah University was established as a private university in May 2015 under the license of the Federal Government of Nigeria.

Hezekiah University is one of the private universities in Nigeria that offers diverse undergraduate programmes.

Hezekiah University has been officially accredited and recognized by the National Universities Commission (NUC), Nigeria.

Faculties and courses 
Faculty of Natural and Applied Sciences

 Plant Science and Biotechnology

 Microbiology

 Biochemistry

 Industrial Chemistry 

 Computer Science

 Mathematics & Statistics

 Physics with Electronics

 Physics

Faculty of Humanities 

 English Language and Literacy Studies

 History and International Studies

 Christian Religious Studies

Faculty of Management and Social Sciences 

 Accounting

 Business Administration

 Economics

 Political Science

 Sociology

 Public Administration

 Marketing

 Mass Communication

References

Universities and colleges in Nigeria
Educational institutions established in 2015
2015 establishments in Nigeria